Northern Mariana Islands competed at the 2019 Pacific Games in Apia, Samoa from 7 to 20 July 2019. The country participated in nine sports at the 2019 games.

Athletics

Badminton

The Marianas named five men and two women in their badminton team for the 2019 games.

Men
 Andreau Galvez
 Nathan Guerrero
 Daniel Macario
 Ezekiel Macario
 Jordan Pangilinan

Women
 Nicole Malasarte
 Janelle Pangilinan

Basketball

5x5

Men's basketball
 TBC

Women's basketball
 TBC

3x3

Men
 TBC

Women
 TBC

Golf

Northern Marianas nominated five players male for the tournament in Samoa, with one to be omitted.

Men
 Joseph Camacho
 Marco Peter
 Sebastian Camacho
 Jessie Atalig
 Ryan Kim

Outrigger canoeing

Sailing

Swimming

Tennis

Volleyball

Beach volleyball

CNMI selected a men's pair (father and son) for their beach volleyball team at the 2019 games.

Men
 Tyce Mister
 Logan Mister

References

Nations at the 2019 Pacific Games
2019